was a Japanese film director, screenwriter, and actor who was known for his war films and comedies and as the mentor of Akira Kurosawa. The combined list of his efforts as a director for documentaries, silent, and sound films includes over 90 film titles during his lifetime.

Early life
Born in Tokyo, Yamamoto attended Keio University, where he helped form a film appreciation society. He first appeared in film in 1921 as an actor opposite Yoshiko Okada, but that only earned the wrath of his family, who disowned him.

Career
He worked as an actor on the stage, joined Nikkatsu as an assistant director, and finally made his directorial debut in 1924 at Tōa Kinema. After working at Nikkatsu again, he was lured to Photo Chemical Laboratories (P. C. L.) in 1934, where he first made a name filming the comedies of Kenichi Enomoto. When P. C. L. became the Toho company, Yamamoto helmed realist dramas such as Tsuzurikata kyōshitsu and Uma (starring Hideko Takamine), and war films such as Hawai Mare oki kaisen.

After World War II, he continued directing films, but increasingly worked in television and radio.

Legacy
He is now mostly known as the mentor of Akira Kurosawa, who served as his assistant director on 17 films.

He is also responsible for the career of Toshiro Mifune.  In 1947, one of Mifune's friends who worked for the Photography Department of Toho Productions suggested Mifune try out for the Photography Department. He was accepted for a position as an assistant cameraman.  At this time, a large number of Toho actors, after a prolonged strike, had left to form their own company, Shin Toho. Toho then organized a "new faces" contest to find new talent. Mifune's friends submitted an application and photo, without his knowledge. He was accepted, along with 48 others (out of roughly 4000 applicants), and allowed to take a screen test for Kajiro Yamamoto. Instructed to mime anger, he drew from his wartime experiences. Yamamoto took a liking to Mifune, recommending him to director Senkichi Taniguchi.

Selected filmography

Director
Danun; 1924 
Renbo kouta shōdoshima jowa; 1924  
Yama no shinpi; 1924
Bakudanji; 1925  
Hito wo kutta hanashi; 1925  
Kagayakeru tobira; 1925
Mori no asa; 1925
Matsuda eiga shōhin-shū: Kumo; 1926 
Junange; 1932 
Momoiro no musume; 1933 
Sōkyū no mon; 1933 
Arupusu taishō; 1934 
Ren'ai ski jutsu; 1934 
Furusato harete; 1934 
Enoken no Kondō Isami (エノケンの近藤勇) (1935)
Sumire musume; 1935 
Botchan; 1935 
Enoken's Ten Millions 2; 1936
Wagahai wa neko de aru; 1936
Enoken no Chakkiri Kinta (エノケンのちゃっきり金太) (1937)  
Utsukushiki taka; 1937, with Kurosawa 
Enoken no chakkiri Kinta 'Go', kaeri wa kowai, mateba hiyori; 1937, with Kurosawa 
Enoken no chakkiri Kinta 'Zen' - Mamayo sandogasa - Ikiwa yoiyoi; 1937, with Kurosawa 
Nihon josei dokuhon (volume 1); 1937, with Kurosawa 
A Husband's Chastity: Fall Once Again; 1937, with Kurosawa 
Otto no teiso - haru kitareba; 1937, with Kurosawa
Enoken no bikkuri jinsei; 1938, with Kurosawa 
Tsuzurikata Kyōshitsu (綴方教室) (1938), with Kurosawa
Tōjūrō no koi; 1938, with Kurosawa 
Nonki Yokocho; 1939, with Kurosawa 
Chushingura (Go); 1939, with Kurosawa 
Chushingura (Zen); 1939, with Kurosawa
Enoken no gatchiri jidai; 1939, with Kurosawa 
Enoken no songokū: songokū zenko-hen; 1940, with Kurosawa
Enoken no zangiri Kinta; 1940, with Kurosawa
Roppa no shinkon ryoko; 1940, with Kurosawa 
Uma (馬) (1941), with Kurosawa
Hawai Mare oki kaisen (ハワイ・マレー沖海戦) (1942)
The Sky of Hope; 1942 
Raigekitai Shutsudō; 1944 
Katō Hayabusa Sentōtai (加藤隼戦闘隊) (1944)
Koi no fuunjî; 1945 
Amerika Yosoro; 1945 
 Those Who Make Tomorrow (明日を作る人々, Asu o tsukuru hitobito) (1946)
Haru no kyōen; 1947 
These Foolish Times II; 1947 
These Foolish Times; 1947 
Four Love Stories; 1947 
Kaze no ko; 1949  
Haru no tawamure; 1949 
Escape from Prison; 1950
Who Knows a Woman's Heart; 1951  
Hopu-san: sararîman no maki; 1951
Elegy; 1951 
Hana no naka no musumetachi; 1953  
Saturday Angel; 1954 
Zoku Take-chan shacho; 1954 
Take-chan shacho; 1954 
Ai no rekishi; 1955 
Muttsuri Umon torimonocho; 1955 
Ore mo otoko sa; 1955
A Man Among Men; 1955
Mt. Manaslu: 8,125 Meters in Altitude (Documentary); 1956 
The Underworld; 1956
Yoshida to Sanpei monogatari: Ohanake no sekai; 1957
A Holiday in Tokyo (東京の休日 Tōkyō no kyūjitsu) (1958)
Jazu musume ni eiko are; 1958 
Monkey Sun (1959) 
Ginza taikutsu musume; 1960
Hana no oedo no musekinin; 1964 
Tensai sagishi monogatari: Tanuki no hanamichi; 1964 
Tameki no taisho; 1965
Neko no kyujitsu; 1966
Take-chan shacho: Seishun de tsukkare!; 1967 
Take-chan shacho: Seishun wa ryu no mono da!; 1967

References

External links 

Japanese film directors
1902 births
1974 deaths
People from Tokyo
Silent film directors
Keio University alumni
20th-century Japanese screenwriters